Vaubecourt is a commune in the Meuse department in Grand Est in north-western France.

See also
Communes of the Meuse department

References

Communes of Meuse (department)
Duchy of Bar